Nora Barrientos Cárdenas (born 1960) is a Chilean agricultural engineer and politician who served as Intendant of the Araucanía Region.

Political career

Early life
Barrientos studied agricultural engineering at the Pontifical Catholic University of Valparaíso. Since her university period she joined the Socialist Party.

As public official
In the state, Barrientos worked at CONADI (1997−2006) and at CORFO (2006−2008). In January 2008, she was appointed Intendant of the Araucanía Region by the president Michelle Bachelet. Her term ended together with the end of Bachelet's first government on 11 March 2010.

On 10 July 2017, she assumed as manager of the Recognition and Development Plan for Araucanía, created by Bachelet in her second government. However, she only lasted a few days in that position because then, on 21 July, she was appointed for second time as Intendant of La Araucanía, replacing Miguel Hernández Saffirio.

References

1960 births
Living people 
21st-century Chilean politicians
Pontifical Catholic University of Valparaíso alumni
Socialist Party of Chile politicians
Intendants of Araucanía Region
21st-century Chilean women politicians
People from Temuco